David Dunn is a Montana politician, and recently served in the Montana House of Representatives.

See also 
 Montana House of Representatives, District 9

References

External links 
 REP. DAVID DUNN (R) - HD9

Living people
Republican Party members of the Montana House of Representatives
21st-century American politicians
Year of birth missing (living people)